The first world record in the women's high jump was recognised by the Fédération Sportive Féminine Internationale (FSFI) in 1922. In 1936, the FSFI was absorbed by the International Association of Athletics Federations, now known as World Athletics. 
As of June 21, 2009, the IAAF (and the FSFI before it) has ratified 56 world records in the event.

Record progression

See also

 Men's high jump world record progression
 Women's high jump all-time top 25: outdoor, indoor 
 List of Olympic medalists in athletics (women)
 Women's high jump Italian record progression

References
 Sporting Heroes

High jump, women
High jump
Articles which contain graphical timelines
High jump
world record